Fiona Hamilton Marshall  is a British pharmacologist, founder and Senior Vice President of Discovery, Preclinical & Translational Medicine at Merck & Co. She will become the next president of the Novartis Institutes for BioMedical Research. She previously served as Chief Scientific Officer at Heptares Therapeutic, where she was Vice President of the Japanese biopharmaceutical company Sosei. She was elected Fellow of the Academy of Medical Sciences in 2016 and the Royal Society in 2021.

Early life and education 
Marshall became interested in biology, chemistry and physics at high school. As a teenager she won a prize at a national physics competition. Marshall graduated with a First class degree in biochemistry from the University of Bath in 1987. She moved to the University of Cambridge for her graduate studies, where she focussed on neuroscience under the supervision of John Hughes. Her doctoral advisor served as director of the University of Cambridge Parke-Davis Research Centre, which inspired Marshall to work in the pharmaceutical industry.

Research and career 
After earning her doctorate Marshall moved to GlaxoSmithKline where she joined the department of neuropharmacology. Marshall worked alongside Patrick Humphrey and Mike Tyers at GlaxoSmithKline. Here she investigated the receptors that are activated by neurotransmitters and microbial metabolites. After only nine years, Marshall was made Head of Molecular Pharmacology in 1999. She eventually moved from the neuropharmacology team to a group working on G protein-coupled receptors. Almost a third of drugs work through these G protein-coupled receptors. She was the first to identify and describe the cloning and structural requirements of the GABAB receptor, a member of the GPCR family. She was headhunted by Millennium Pharmaceuticals and joined as their Director of Molecular Pharmacology in 2000. When her children were young, Marshall took time out of her work at GlaxoSmithKline to work more flexibly.

Working with Malcolm Weir, Marshall founded Heptares Therapeutics, a spin-out from the Medical Research Council (MRC). Heptares makes use of technologies developed by the Medical Research Council that allow the crystallisation and characterisation of G protein-coupled receptors. One of the cancer therapy drug candidates developed by Heptares was licensed to AstraZeneca in 2015. Later that year, Heptares was incorporated into the Japanese biopharmaceutical company Sosei.

Marshall joined Merck & Co as Head of the Discovery Research Centre in 2018. In this capacity she concentrated on diseases of ageing. In 2019 she was made Head of Neuroscience Discovery, where she spent two years before being appointed Senior Vice President of Discovery, Preclinical & Translational Medicine Research. She serves on the council of the Academy of Medical Sciences and the Medical Research Council.

Awards and honours 

 2012 WISE Campaign award for Innovation and Entrepreneurship
 2015 Royal Society of Chemistry Malcolm Campbell Award 
 2016 Elected a Fellow of the Academy of Medical Sciences (FMedSci)
 2016 Honorary degree at the University of Bath
 2018 Vane Medal from the British Pharmacological Society
 2018 Honorary Fellow of British Pharmacological Society
 2021 Elected a Fellow of the Royal Society (FRS)

Selected publications

References 

Living people
Alumni of the University of Bath
Alumni of the University of Cambridge
British pharmacologists
Women pharmacologists
20th-century British scientists
20th-century British women scientists
21st-century British scientists
21st-century British women scientists
GSK plc people
Merck & Co. people
Fellows of the Academy of Medical Sciences (United Kingdom)
Fellows of the Royal Society
Year of birth missing (living people)
Novartis people